David Schulhof  is an American music industry executive and film producer. He is the President of Music Publishing at LiveOne, a global platform for livestream and on-demand audio, video, and podcast content.  Previously, he was President of IM Global Music and President of Music at AGC Studios. Schulhof was co-founder and CEO of the music publishing company Evergreen Copyrights, now a division of BMG Rights Management. He has worked as music supervisor or executive producer on numerous films and television shows.

Early life and education

Schulhof was born and grew up in New York City. His mother is an antiquarian, and his father, a businessman, was the chief executive of Sony Corporation of America in the 1990s. David graduated from Georgetown University and received a law degree from New York University. He is a member of the New York State Bar.

Career

In the 1990s, Schulhof migrated from business affairs to the music industry. He worked for Dimension Films and Miramax. In 1999, he became VP of motion picture music and legal affairs for Miramax, where he served as executive producer on more than a hundred soundtracks.

Together with music executives Joel Katz and Richard Perna, Schulhof created the music publishing company EverGreen Copyright Acquisitions in 2006 by buying six music catalogs, including Rykomusic. Schulhof and Perna served as co-CEOs, with Schulhof overseeing the company’s global film, TV and advertising department as well as creative affairs. The same year, they purchased the MC Hammer catalog and the copyright administration company Integrated Copyright Group to manage their worldwide administration. EverGreen acquired the writer's share of Tupac Shakur's publishing catalog and the rap label Death Row Records in 2007.

EverGreen was sold to BMG Rights Management in 2010, when it held 65,000 copyrights. Schulhof became managing director of media business at G2, a private equity spinoff of Guggenheim Partners.

Schulhof formed a joint venture with IM Global, a subsidiary of Reliance Group, in 2014. He became president and partner of their music division, IM Global Music, managing film soundtracks and other music for IM Global. In 2015, he brokered a multiple picture deal with Republic Records for music-driven feature films.

In 2017, Schulhof served as Executive Producer of the award winning music documentary Clive Davis: the Soundtrack of our Lives.  The film was sold to Apple Music and opened up the Tribeca Film Festival at Radio City Music Hall that year.

In 2018, together with other IM Global executives, Schulhof moved to AGC Studios, overseeing music-driven film and TV content, as well as AGC's music publishing operations as Head of Music.

Personal life

David Schulhof married Lesley Gurkin in 2007. They have a daughter and live on Upper East Side.

Filmography

References

External links

David Schulhof on Bloomberg

Georgetown University alumni
New York University School of Law alumni
Living people
American chief executives in the media industry
Businesspeople from New York City
21st-century American businesspeople
1971 births